Grigoris Giannaros (April 1936 – 5 August 1997) was a Greek politician and journalist who served in the Ecumenical Cabinet of Xenophon Zolotas and as a Member of the Hellenic Parliament.

Early life and education 

Giannaros was born in April 1936 in the village of Salmoni, Elis. He studied economics at the Supreme School of Economics and Business (ASOEE), and completed post-graduate studies at the Russian Academy of Sciences.

Political career 

Giannaros was a member of the Central Committee of Synaspismos. He was first elected to the Hellenic Parliament representing Athens B in the June 1989 election. In November 1989, he was appointed as an Alternate Industry Minister in the ecumenical cabinet of Xenophon Zolotas. He was re-elected as an MP for Athens B in the same month. In February 1990, he was removed from his position in a cabinet reshuffle, and was elected in the April 1990 election as the representative of Athens A.

Personal life 

Giannaros was married to Sonia Tsitilou and they had one son.

Death 

Giannaros died on 5 August 1997 after a "lengthy illness". He was buried at Athens First Cemetery.

References 

Government ministers of Greece
1936 births
1997 deaths
Coalition of Left, of Movements and Ecology politicians
Greek MPs 1989 (June–November)
Greek MPs 1989–1990
Greek MPs 1990–1993
People from Pyrgos, Elis